Kishorit is a kibbutz in northern Israel. Located in the Galilee near Karmiel, it falls under the jurisdiction of Misgav Regional Council. Its members are all disabled adults.

History
The kibbutz was originally founded in the late 1970s under the name Kishor, but was abandoned a few years later. In 1997 it was refounded as Kishorit, a kibbutz for individuals with special needs. Named after the Bible (Proverbs 31:19) together with the nearby  kibbutz Pelekh, whose name is the corresponding word of the same sentence.

Kishorit provides its members with employment opportunities, leisure activities, private living quarters, medical supervision, nursing care and opportunities for social integration in Israeli society. All members are assigned work duty in the laundry room, kitchen or  one of ten work centers. The centers, all headed by outside professionals, include an organic goat farm,  a chicken coop,  a toy factory and a dog kennel that breeds miniature schnauzers sold in Europe.

References

External links
Village website

Kibbutzim
Kibbutz Movement
Populated places established in the 1970s
Populated places in Northern District (Israel)
1970s establishments in Israel
Disability organizations based in Israel